South Central Incorporated (Formally South Central Communications) is a privately owned company based in Evansville, Indiana, and owned and operated by the Engelbrecht family: John D. Engelbrecht (President & CEO), JP Engelbrecht (Vice-President & COO), and Bettie G. Engelbrecht (Director Emeritus).

Television stations

Former properties

Radio stations formerly owned by South Central

It was announced on May 28, 2014, that Midwest Communications was to purchase nine of the ten stations owned by South Central Communications. With this purchase, Midwest Communications expanded its portfolio of stations to Evansville, Knoxville and Nashville. WEJK (Which was owned by Boonville Broadcasting &  operated by South Central Communications) was not involved in the sale as it would not fit under the ownership cap for Midwest. It was grandfathered in for South Central under previous ownership rules. It was stated at the time that it was likely that Boonville Broadcasting would take back operations of WEJK before or after the sale of South Central Communications other stations were finalized. It was then announced on August 18, 2014 that South Central Communications will be turning the operations of WEJK over to The Original Company, as Boonville Broadcasting will continue to own the station. Once approved by the FCC, The Original Company will take over the operations of WEJK and would operate the station via a time brokerage agreement. The changeover was completed on September 1. The sale of the nine former South Central Communications radio stations to Midwest Communications were also finalized on September 1.

Television stations formerly owned by South Central

Other Former Properties
 South Central owned a full-service digital advertising and marketing agency headquartered in Nashville, Tennessee and operated throughout the U.S. under the South Central Digital Banner until 2016, when South Central sold it and the agency was renamed 16DIGITAL.

References

External links
 South Central Incorporated

Mass media companies of the United States
Broadcasting companies of the United States
Television broadcasting companies of the United States
Companies based in Evansville, Indiana